The Aksaray Malaklısı or Malaklı Karabaş is a Turkish breed of large livestock guardian dog, from the Aksaray Province in Central Anatolia.

History 

The Aksaray Malaklısı originates in, and is named for, the Aksaray Province in Central Anatolia. It is believed to descend from a common ancestor with the Kangal, but has been selectively bred for larger size and greater weight. Genetic analysis has shown it to be distinct breed other Turkish livestock guardian dog breeds, including the Kangal, Akbash and Kars.

The "malakli" part of the breed name is said to be due to their pendulous jowls.

Characteristics 

It is typically grey in colour with a black mask; the coat is short. The head and ears are large, the jowls are pendulous, and the tail is straight. The dogs only obey commands from the master, and can be aggressive with other people. They typically do not tolerate working with other dogs of the same sex. Their lifespan is 13-15 years.

Use 

The Aksaray Malaklısı is used in its homeland to protect flocks of sheep from predators, especially wolves. A pair of Aksaray Malaklısı, always a male and a female, can protect some 700-800 sheep.

References 

Dog breeds originating in Turkey
Livestock guardian dogs